Quinque may refer to:
 Quinque-, a number prefix meaning 5 in English
 Quinque, Virginia, an unincorporated community in Greene County, United States
and also:
 Quinque viae, five arguments regarding the existence of God summarized by the 13th-century Roman Catholic philosopher and theologian St. Thomas Aquinas

See also
 Cinque (disambiguation), an Italian word that carries the meaning of "five"